Petr Borkovec (April 17, 1970, Louňovice pod Blaníkem) is a Czech poet, translator and journalist.

He studied Czech language and literature at the Philosophical Faculty of the Charles University but did not finish his studies.

His poems have been translated into almost all European languages. His books have been published in Austria and in Italy. Borkovec translates mostly 20th-century Russian poetry.

Works

Poetry
Prostírání do tichého, Pražská imaginace, 1990
Poustevna, věštírna, loutkárna, Mladá fronta, 1991
Ochoz, Mladá fronta, 1994
Ze tří knih = Aus drei Büchern, Buchwerkstatt Thanhäuser, 1995 (German translation)
Mezi oknem, stolem a postelí, Český spisovatel, 1996
Polní práce, Mladá fronta, 1998
Feldarbeit: Gedichte, Edition Korrespondenzen, 2001 (German translation)
A. B. A. F., Opus, 2002
Needle-book, Paseka, 2003
Nadelbuch: Gedichte, Edition Korrespondenzen, 2004 (German translation) 
Vnitrozemí, Fra, 2005
Amselfassade. Berlin-Notate, Friedenauer Presse, 2006 (German translation) 
Berlínský sešit / Zápisky ze Saint-Nazaire, Fra, 2008
From the Interior: Poems 1995-2005, Seren, 2008 (English translation)
Jedna věta, Revolver Revue, 2011
Milostné básně, Fra, 2012
Liebesgedichte, Edition Korrespondenzen, 2014 (German translation)

Anthologies
Krajiny milosti. Antologie české duchovní lyriky XX. století, 1994
Sborník k pětasedmdesátinám Ivana Slavíka, 1995.

Translations
U řek babylónských, Torst, 1996 - anthology of Russian emigrant poetry
Sophocles: Král Oidipús, premiered at HaDivadlo in 1998, in print by Větrné mlýny in 1999 — translated with Matyáš Havrda
Jasná luna v prázdných horách, Paseka, 2001 — anthology of classical Korean poetry, with Vladimír Pucek
Aischylos: Oresteia, premiered a published by the National Theatre June 18, 2002 — translated with Matyáš Havrda
Vladimir Nabokov: Ut pictura poesis, Triáda, 2002) — translated with Jaroslav Kabíček
Vladislav Khodasevich: Těžká lyra, Opus, 2004 — poems translated by Petr Borkovec, esseys translated by Miluše Zadražilová
Yuri Odartschenko: Verše do alba, Fra, 2005
Yevgeny Rein: Bylo, byli, byla, byl…, Opus, 2005

His translations of poems by authors such as Zinaida Gippius, Georgy Ivanov, Joseph Brodsky were published in magazines.

Awards
1995 — Cena Jiřího Ortena (Jiří Orten Award) in 1994 for his book Ochoz
2001 — Hubert-Burda-Preis and Norbert-C.-Kaser-Preis for the German translation of his book Polní práce
2002 — Prémie Tomáše Hrácha for his translation of Oresteia (with Matyáš Havrda)
2004 — Cena Josefa Jungmanna (main creative award) for his translation of a part of Heavy Lyre by Vladislav Khodasevich

References

External links

Czech poets
Czech male poets
Czech translators
People from Benešov District
1970 births
Living people